Prince Asem bin Nayef (born 27 April 1948) is the son of Prince Nayef bin Abdullah (a younger son of Abdullah I of Jordan) and Princess Mihrimah Sultan (granddaughter of Sultan Mehmed V of the Ottoman Empire). It is claimed he is the 42nd generation direct descendant of Prophet Muhammad.

Education 

Prince Asem completed his high school education at Millfield School in Somerset, England. He earned his university degree in interior architecture in England of 1972.

Professional career 

After university Prince Asem worked for several years in Spain with a leading architectural firm to gain experience. In 1974, he returned to Amman where he started his own architectural business, in addition to importing and exporting furniture and accessories.

Between 1994 and 1996, he taught Interior Design at Petra University. In 1993, he established a security company named Al-Saher for Security. In addition, he established the Jordan Vision Company for Telecommunication. He is the President of both companies.

His hobbies include horse back riding, scuba diving and reading.

Activities 

 Vice President of the Royal Jordanian Equestrian Federation
 President of SPANA (Society for the Protection of Animals Abroad)
 Representative and Agent of several Chinese companies

Family 

Prince Asem married in 1974 Firouzeh Vokhshouri; they divorced in 1985. They have three daughters:
 Princess Yasmine (born 30 June 1975), married on 2 September 2005 Basel Yaghnam.
 Princess Sara (born 12 August 1978), married on 26 June 2008 Alejandro Garrido.
 Princess Noor (born 6 October 1982), married from 29 August 2003 until 9 September 2009 Prince Hamzah bin Hussein.

Prince Asem married his current wife, Sana Kalimat, on 6 January 1986. He has three children with her:
 Princess Salha (born 14 June 1987), married on 4 April 2011 Mohammad Hashim Haj-Hassan.
 Princess Nejla (born 9 May 1988), married On 23 October 2014 Nasser Osama Talhouni.
 Prince Nayef (born 22 January 1998), married on 13 April 2021 Sharifa Farah Alluhaymaq. The couple has a son, Prince Nayef bin Asem (born 14 January 2023).

References 

1948 births
House of Hashim
Living people
People educated at Millfield
Jordanian princes
Academic staff of Petra University

20th-century Jordanian people